Muki (Quechua for asphyxia, also for a goblin who lives in caves, hispanicized spelling Muqui) is a mountain in the Andes of Peru, about  high. It is located in the Lima Region, Oyón Province, Oyón District. Muki lies northwest of the mountain named Luliqucha.

References

Mountains of Peru
Mountains of Lima Region